Airborne Command & Control Squadron 117 (VAW-117) is an airborne early warning (AEW) and command and control (C2) squadron. Nicknamed "The Wallbangers" (formerly "The Nighthawks"), it flies the E-2D Hawkeye, the USN's only carrier-based command and control platform. The squadron is based in NAS Point Mugu and deploys as part of Carrier Air Wing 9 (CVW-9) on board .

History

1970s

The squadron was established at NAS North Island, California on 1 July 1974, as part of Fighter Early Warning Wing, U.S. Pacific Fleet. The squadron received its first E-2B aircraft in October 1974 and in October the following year deployed to the Mediterranean Sea on board . The squadron made its first Western Pacific (WESTPAC) deployment with Carrier Air Wing Two on board  in February 1979.

1980s
During its 1988 WESTPAC deployment on board , VAW-117 played a key role in Operation Praying Mantis during which an Iranian ship was destroyed. In addition, the squadron provided command and control during attacks on oil platforms and small ships.
Prior to changing their name to "WallBangers" then "NightHawks" they were first called "Lemurs".

1990s
On board ’s maiden WESTPAC voyage in May 1991, VAW-117 assisted in the evacuation of dependents from the Philippines after the eruption of Mount Pinatubo during Operation Fiery Vigil. VAW-117 was awarded the Joint Meritorious Unit Award for its efforts in assisting in the evacuation. In 1999, VAW-117 was selected to provide operational testing for the Navy's newest AEW upgrade, the MCU/ACIS (Mission Computer Upgrade/ Advance Computer Information System).

2000s

In July 2001, VAW-117 was the first squadron to deploy with the new MCU/ACIS system. WESTPAC 2001–02 on board  proved to be an active deployment. After the September 11 attacks in 2001, aircraft from VAW-117 and CVW-11 were among the first aircraft to lead the strikes on Afghanistan as part of Operation Enduring Freedom. The extensive radar and communication equipment on board the E-2C Hawkeye allowed the squadron to continuously provided battle space management over Pakistan and southern Afghanistan, ensuring the safety of all airborne assets and clearance from commercial air routes. The squadron's Hawkeyes served as an information-clearing house, providing a communications relay between command authorities on the ground and tactical aircraft airborne.
VAW-117 was the first fleet squadron to receive the HE-2K variant of the Hawkeye and also the first fleet Hawkeye squadron to receive the Cooperative Engagement Capability system (CEC).

This was VAW-117's first deployment with the HE2K variant. During the deployment, VAW-117 flew into Karachi, Pakistan, and Goa, India, to display the E-2C to partner nations. The Nimitz while on deployment visited Hong Kong; Kuala Lumpur, Malaysia; Guam; Manama, Bahrain; Dubai, UAE; Perth, Australia; and Pearl Harbor, Hawaii, twice.

In April 2007 VAW-117 deployed on WESTPAC 2007. The squadron flew 101 sorties and 227 hours in direct support of Operation Enduring Freedom and the Iraq War. It also took part in several exercises including Valiant Shield and Malabar.

In January 2008 the squadron deployed on a four-month surge to the Western Pacific, where it took part in Exercise Foal Eagle 08. During the course of the cruise, VAW-117 demonstrated its aviation skills, earning the CVW-11 Top Hook Award for the first time in nearly eight years.

2010s

In April 2013 the squadron deployed with CVW-11 on board  in support of Operation Enduring Freedom. It ended up being an extended deployment of eight months and they returned on 10 December 2013. During the deployment, due to their outstanding landing grades earned them the coveted "Golden Hook" award for having the best overall landing performance of the fixed-wing squadrons.

In January 2015 the squadron transferred to Carrier Air Wing 7 (CVW-7) aboard .

In 2016, VAW-117 was awarded the Battle Efficiency Award while on board .

See also
 History of the United States Navy
 List of United States Navy aircraft squadrons

References

External links 

 

Early warning squadrons of the United States Navy